Shewa Tehsil is a subdivision located in North Waziristan district, Khyber Pakhtunkhwa, Pakistan. The population is 39,349 according to the 2017 census.

See also 
 List of tehsils of Khyber Pakhtunkhwa

References 

Tehsils of Khyber Pakhtunkhwa
Populated places in North Waziristan